Topmodell was a Hungarian reality television series that was based on American model Tyra Banks' America's Next Top Model.  Hungarian model Viktória Vámosi hosted the first cycle, but left the show near the end of the season due to creative discrepancies with the Hungarian producers. She was replaced by Panni Epres.

The winner of the contest will win: a three-year modelling contract with Metropolitan Models in Paris, a one-year contract with Max Factor cosmetics, a one-year supply of Wella product, a campaign for Jana mineral water and a brand new Lancia Ypsilon.

The finale was live and featured a twist: along with the original top three, Réka Nagy, Anna Rónaszéki, and Judit Lattmann, the audience had the chance to vote one of the ten previously eliminated models back into the competition. The audience chose Valentina Papp, who had been eliminated some episodes back. Papp surpassed Lattmann to win third place. The winner of the competition was Réka Nagy.

The debut season of the show premiered on Viasat 3 in September 2006 and finished 22 December 2006.

Cycles

Contestants

Summaries

Call-out order

 The contestant was eliminated
 The contestant won the competition

 In Episode 9, no contestants were called, and all the contestants continued in the competition
 Although Valentina was eliminated in episode 7, she was brought back in episode 12.
 Panni Epres hosted the finale because Viktória was fired.

Photo shoot guide
Episode 2 photo shoot: Promotional pictures 
Episode 3 photo shoot: Body paint with weapons
Episode 4 photo shoot: Capturing an intimate moment with male models
Episode 5 photo shoot: Standing out of a crowd
Episode 6 photo shoot: Posing with diamonds
Episode 7 photo shoot: Posing on a boat
Episode 8 photo shoot: Seven deadly sins
Episode 10 photo shoot: Posing with wild animals
Episode 11 photo shoot: Supernatural heroines; beauty shots portraying different emotions
Episode 12 photo shoot: Posing as fashionable mothers with babies

Judges
Viktoria Vamosi
Zita Sípos
Zoltán Herczeg
Miklós Bémer

External links
 Hungary's Next Top Model Official Site
 Report about each parts of the series (in Hungarian)at HazaiDivat.hu

Hungary's Next Top Model
2006 Hungarian television series debuts
2006 Hungarian television series endings
2000s Hungarian television series
Hungarian reality television series
Viasat 3 original programming